is a Japanese light novel series written by Asaura, with illustrations by Kaito Shibano. Shueisha published 15 novels from February 2008 to February 2014. Shibano also illustrates three manga adaptations, and a fourth manga is drawn by Sankaku Head. A 12-episode anime television series adaptation produced by David Production aired in Japan between October and December 2011. Funimation has licensed the anime in North America.

Plot
While innocently reaching for some half-priced bento, Yō Satō finds himself beaten up on the floor of a supermarket. He soon learns that getting half-priced bento is an all-out brawl between customers. Yō is invited to the Half-Priced Food Lovers Club by one of the top fighters, Sen Yarizui, in order to train to compete in these battles.

Bento brawls
Bento brawls are big, all-out, free for all battles for half-priced bento boxes, where victors are decided by who claims the bento first. The brawls are governed by a set of unspoken rules among the brawlers, mainly to keep each brawl fair and even.

 Every brawler must wait away from the bento area until the God of Discounts, the ones who put the half-price sticker on the bento boxes, puts the sticker on the bento boxes and leave to the break room before beginning to battle. To take one beforehand and to harass the God of Discounts is disrespectful, as the last thing they need at the end of their shift are people harassing them for their discount.
 If another brawler manages to get a bento for themselves, they cannot be attacked. If two or more brawlers get their hands on the same bento, then they fight among themselves until the other lets go of the bento.
 A brawler can only take one bento, to take another would be greedy and would spoil the victory for another.
 Brawlers should never do anything to cause a bento to spill, doing that would mean one less bento for someone to get.

Aside from that, whatever methods one can use in obtaining a bento can be used from simply brawling to using baskets and chopsticks as weapons, even running around avoiding fights altogether, are valid strategies. Sometimes brawlers fight in groups, such as the Half-Priced Food Lovers Club (Yō, Sen and sometimes Hana) and the Orthros pair who will often fight with each other while going after separate bento or team up to take out a threat before brawling with each other.

Those that fight for bento boxes are often known as "wolves". Inexperienced bento brawlers are considered "dogs", usually considered as such when they do not understand the essence of bento brawls and use tactics that are looked down upon. Those that go against the rules and will selfishly go after bento and harass the staff are known as "boars" and have no respect among brawlers. Bento brawlers will often do everything in their power to stop boars from obtaining bento, as they go against everything brawlers stand for, and thus do not deserve the bento. Strong and notable brawlers are often given titles (which are usually associated with personality or appearance), though how they get their titles (and in the case of Yō, the title itself) is usually less than impressive.

Characters

The protagonist, a high school freshman who finds himself dragged into the battle for half-priced bento. He enjoys playing retro video games, particularly Sega games. Though at first shown not able to even hold his ground in a bento brawl, he soon shows remarkable strength, enough to be recognized as an equal by Yū, the Wizard, and win a one-on-one fight against Ayame. Therefore, he often fantasizes about girls (usually Sen, whom he has a crush on), but despite his perverted behaviour, most of the female characters seem to have developed feelings for him (Ayame, Hana, the older Sawagi twin, Asabi, and even Sen), even if it is somewhat comedic (like Hana or Asebi). He also has somewhat of a S&M relationship with his class representative, Ume (as perceived by his perverted classmate (Uchimoto again)), however, really she just beats him up because of her crush on Hana who Yo hangs out with a lot (mainly because of the Bento Brawls). Nonetheless, he is able to focus on the task at hand and do what he is asked to do.

A second year student who is the current president (and initially, the only remaining member) of the Half Priced Food Lovers Club. Her title comes from her accidentally almost buying a chūhai called  because she liked the design and assumed it was a normal drink, in addition to it being on sale. While usually calm, she's very innocent and does not particularly know a lot outside of bento brawls and can sometimes be pretty clumsy. She can be very stubborn as well, especially when it involves a challenge from another wolf. Sen, however, does have a good heart, preferring not to judge people by appearances or hold any grudges. She doesn't seem to have any dislikes, besides bento brawlers who do not follow the rules and boys who ignore girls that have been hurt. Despite Yō having many fantasies of Sen, she appears to be oblivious to this particular side of him. Regardless, she cares for his well-being and often shares bento with him, hinting that she may like him.

Yō's half-Italian cousin. Like Yō, she is an avid gamer, and enjoys flirting with him and occasionally Hana. She is well known for using chopsticks in battle. Her personality varies depending on her mood; normally, she is very out-going, and loves toying with Yō, but if she is hurt, she becomes very sensitive and harsh against him and Sen, much preferring to have Yō eat with her or be alone at that point. She often goes scouting out other wolves and usually hangs out with Yō and Sen, whom she shares a friendly rivalry with.

An easily excitable girl who joins the Half Priced Food Lovers Club. Her hobby is writing yaoi erotic novels, having its characters inspired on other wolves. Not a fighter type at all, Hana usually resorts to sneaking past the other wolves, while they are fighting, to grab a bento for herself, which works most of the time. People used to bully her and get mad if she even touched them, saying that she has germs and will infect them, until she began to frantically apologize to anyone she touches and try to clean them up after the "contamination". Since meeting Sen and Yō, that behaviour has gradually changed and eventually, it no longer occurred.

The student council president of Yō's school (and class representative of Yō's class) who is obsessed with Hana and usually beats Yō up out of jealousy, despite also being prone to flirt with other girls like Ayame. She often asks if it is all right for her to get irritated or hit a person immediately after doing so.

A year before the events of the story, he was the president of the Half Priced Food Lovers Club, and personally taught Sen the rules of bento brawling.

A schoolmate of Ayame who is also in the gaming club at their school. She is cursed with extreme bad luck which spreads to anybody she touches (usually Yō), though she is oblivious to her curse and has a happy-go-lucky and childlike personality otherwise. She always has a cold so she is often seen wearing a scarf and hat. It is hinted she might have feelings for Yō, making him cookies and a bento (with unlucky results).

A wolf who was once the head of a group known as the Gabriel Ratchet. After a strong showing from Yō, he declared him as his rival, though has a lot of problems when associating with him, especially because of the incident where Yō got the nickname of pervert which he personally helped spread. Despite being unwilling to have anything to do with Yō, he is somewhat similar to him in personality and preference; he has a crush on Matsuba (as Yō does with Sen) and often blushes whenever an awkward situation is presented to him (just as Yō does when he starts fantasizing). He often associates himself with Ayame as they are from the same area and will usually work with her to gather information about other wolves. Despite being a noteworthy wolf, he has yet to gain a proper nickname.

 and 

A pair of twin sisters who are the respective Student Council President and Vice President of Ayame's school. Their names sound identical but spelled with different kanji; the elder twin is named with the kanji for 'bellflower' while the younger twin is named with the kanji for 'mirror'. Before the start of the story, they were inspired to become bento brawlers after witnessing one at such a young age and became one of the strongest bento brawlers until a manipulative brawler known as the Club of Hercules made a deal with the other local wolves to simply let them pass by, thus taking the fun out of the brawls. Due to this, they lost all desire to continue until three years later, after they try to get a look of Sen in the hospital, when it was Yō who was hospitalized, not Sen.

Goatee

Monk

Media

Light novels
Shueisha published 15 volumes between February 22, 2008 and February 25, 2014 under Shueisha's Super Dash Bunko imprint; 12 comprise the main story, while the other three are short story collections. Other short stories were published online on Super Dash Bunko's official website and in Super Dash Manga Program, a separate volume included with Shueisha's Jump Square manga magazine.

Manga
A manga adaptation, illustrated by Kaito Shibano and titled Ben-To Zero: Road to Witch, serialized five chapters between the first issue of Super Dash Manga Program, included with the combined May/June 2011 issue of Jump Square sold on April 21, 2011, and the issue included with the October 2011 issue of Jump Square. A single tankōbon volume was released on October 25, 2011. Another manga, also illustrated by Shibano and titled Ben-To Another: Ripper's Night, was serialized between the December 2011 and October 2012 issues of Shueisha's Super Dash & Go! magazine. A single volume of Ben-To Another was released on October 25, 2012. A third manga illustrated by Shibano, titled , was serialized between the December 2012 and June 2013 issues of Super Dash & Go!. A single volume of Ben-To A La Carte was released on November 22, 2013. Another manga adaptation, illustrated by Sankaku Head and titled Ben-To Sankakkei, was serialized between the October 2012 and June 2013 issues of Super Dash & Go!.

Anime
A 12-episode anime television series adaptation produced by David Production and directed by Shin Itagaki aired in Japan between October 9, 2011 and December 25, 2011 on TV Aichi. The opening theme for episode four is "Treasure!" by Emiri Katō. The anime series is licensed and streamed by Funimation in North America.

Episode list

Reception
The Mainichi Shimbun reported that as of March 2011, over 550,000 copies of the light novels have been sold in Japan. The light novel series has ranked three times in Takarajimasha's light novel guide book Kono Light Novel ga Sugoi! published yearly: eighth in 2010, fifth in 2011, and third in 2012.

Theron Martin of Anime News Network gave the series an overall A− rating. Despite finding some inconsistencies with the animation in places, Martin praised the series for its action scenes, soundtrack and humor, concluding that: "Watching Ben-To definitely will not strain your brain, and doesn't delve into themes any more complicated than the value of integrity, or fostering a passion for life. Regardless, it's a pretty fun little show." Aiden Foote, writing for THEM Anime Reviews, saw potential in the premise but found the fight scenes and humor lacking and gave way to characters ranging from obnoxious (Ume and the Kyo sisters) to pointless (Hana and Shaga), saying that: "Ultimately, my displeasure towards the show lies deeply in disappointment, not because it isn't great (I never expected that) but that it's not even good. Without the stupid characters and the stupid humour, I might have been really able to enjoy this silly little series for all it was worth."

References

External links
Ben-To at Shueisha 
Anime official website 
Ben-To at Funimation

2008 Japanese novels
2011 Japanese television series debuts
2011 manga
Anime and manga based on light novels
Action anime and manga
Comedy anime and manga
Funimation
School life in anime and manga
Light novels
Shueisha franchises
Shueisha manga
Shōnen manga
David Production
Harem anime and manga